Fengjing is a town in Jinshan District, Shanghai. An ancient water town, it also has a new town with a Canadian theme and an industrial zone. It is a centre for Jinshan peasant painting.

It lies next to the G60 Shanghai–Kunming Expressway and China National Highway 320. Fengjing's railway stations are Fengjing station, on the Shanghai-Kunming Railway, and Jinshan North station on the Shanghai-Hangzhou High-Speed Railway, which opened in 2010.

Old town

Fengjing Old Town is a water town, or canal town, dating back to the time of the Yuan Dynasty. It is known for its ancient stone bridges, including the well known Three Bridges. The town is the birthplace of artist Cheng Shifa and cartoonist Ding Cong.

Jinshan peasant painting originated in the Fengjing village of Zhonghong. Since the 1970s this has become a nationally and internationally exhibited form of folk art. A new peasant painters village has been built at Zhonghong, for local peasant artists to live and work in alongside others from peasant art traditions elsewhere in China.

New town
Fengjing New Town is a product of the One City, Nine Towns initiative, which was introduced in 2001 and lasted for the duration of the tenth five year plan (2001–2005). This policy sited one new town in each of the suburban districts of Shanghai, and each town was given its own architectural theme. Fengjing received a Canadian theme. Other Western themes which were used included English, Scandinavian, Italian, Spanish, Dutch and German.

The plan for the new town was for an area of 5.4 square kilometres, to be completed in 2010. In 2004 Canadian architects Six Degrees Architecture and Design provided designs for a collection of neighbourhoods built around canals and a central lake. These designs were used for the landscaping and infrastructure layout of the town. However Chinese designers were then brought in for the commercial and residential building. As of 2010 the town was still incomplete.

Industrial zone
Fengjing Industrial Zone is an Economic and Technological Development Zone. It contains Shanghai Textile Industry Pilot Zone, covering 8.6 square kilometres, Shanghai International Garment Machinery Centre covering 4 square kilometres, and another area of 11 square kilometres whose major products include alcoholic beverages and automobiles.

The car manufacturer Shanghai Maple Guorun Automobile was founded in Fengjing Industrial Zone in 1999, and subsequently became a subsidiary of Geely. Geely uses its Fengjing factory to manufacture London black taxi cabs for worldwide export; this was originally a joint venture with a British company, but Geely took over that company in 2013.

Notes

References

External links
Fengjing government website

Towns in Shanghai